The prime minister of Malawi was the head of government of Malawi from 1964 to 1966.

Prime Minister of Malawi
Political parties

See also 
List of Governors-General of Malawi
List of heads of state of Malawi
Lists of incumbents

Prime Minister
Prime Minister
Prime Minister
Malawi
Prime Minister of Malawi